Psy is a South Korean pop singer best known for his 2012 hit single "Gangnam Style".

Psy or PSY may also refer to:

 Psy (film), a 1992 film directed by Wladyslaw Pasikowski
 Psychedelic trance, or simply psy, a form of electronic music
 Psy, rapper in the Canadian group, the Oddities
 Simon "Psy" Kaina, character in the manga and anime Heroman
 ISO 639-3 code for the Piscataway language, an extinct Native American language
 The IATA airport code for Port Stanley Airport at Port Stanley in the Falkland Islands
 P.S.Y., a French band known for their song "Angelina", which was parodied by several bands in the Philippines
 Phytoene synthase, an enzyme involved in the synthesis of phytoene.

See also 

 
 Psi (disambiguation)
 Psych (disambiguation)
 Psyche (disambiguation)
 Psycho (disambiguation)
 Psychedelic (disambiguation)